is Cute's 5th studio album. It was released on February 24, 2010 in two editions—a normal, CD-only edition (EPCE-5696), and a limited edition with an alternative cover, which came with a bonus DVD (EPCE-5694-5). Both editions contained a special photo-card.

The album debuted at number 25 in the Oricon Weekly Albums Chart, remaining in the chart for 2 weeks.

Track listings

CD 

"The Party!"

Sung by Airi Suzuki.
"Bye Bye Bye!"
"Lonely girl's night"
Sung by Maimi Yajima.

Sung by Saki Nakajima, Chisato Okai and Mai Hagiwara.
"Shock!"

DVD

Charts

References

External links 
Shocking 5 at the official Hello! Project discography
Up-Front Works discography

2010 albums
Cute (Japanese idol group) albums
Zetima albums